Brooke Bailey Johnson is an accomplished television executive. She served as Program Director for "Live with Regis and Kathie Lee" from its local broadcast and into its national syndication. Bailey Johnson currently serves as the President, Food Category for Scripps Network Interactive. Under her leadership, she oversees the following networks: Food Network, Cooking Channel, FoodNetwork.com, CookingChannelTV.com, Food2.com, Recipezaar.com and Enterprises, the new business and licensing and merchandising arm of the company.

Awards 
1999 - Cable Marketer of the Year by Ad Week

2005 - Women of Vision

2010 - WICT Woman of the Year

2013 -  Named one of the most influential women in cable by CableFAX: the Magazine

Life 
Bailey Johnson earned a bachelor's degree in English literature from Northwestern University and a master's degree from the University's Medill School of Journalism. In addition, she completed the Kellogg School of Business Advanced Executive Program.

References

External links 
 Crain Lecture: Brooke Bailey Johnson, Food Network President, Medill University of Canada, April 23, 2012

Northwestern University alumni
Medill School of Journalism alumni
Kellogg School of Management alumni
Living people
Year of birth missing (living people)
Place of birth missing (living people)